Pedro Rosas Bravo (born 1951) is a former Venezuelan politician who served as Minister of Finance during the Second presidency of Carlos Andrés Pérez.

He graduated with a cum laude degree in Economics from Andrés Bello Catholic University and Master of Science in Econometrics and Mathematical Economics joint programme from the London School of Economics and the University of East Anglia.

References

1951 births
Living people
Finance ministers of Venezuela
Andrés Bello Catholic University alumni
Alumni of the London School of Economics
Alumni of the University of East Anglia
Academic staff of Andrés Bello Catholic University
Academic staff of the Central University of Venezuela
Government ministers of Venezuela